

Theuderic I (c. 485 – 533/34) was the Merovingian king of Metz, Rheims, or Austrasia—as it is variously called—from 511 to 533 or 534.

He was the son of Clovis I and one of his earlier wives or concubines (possibly a Franco-Rhenish Princess, Evochildis of Cologne). In accordance with Salian tradition, the kingdom was divided between Clovis's four surviving sons: Childebert I in Paris, Chlodomer in Orléans, and Chlothar I in Soissons. Theuderic inherited Metz in 511 at his father's death. Early in his reign, he sent his son Theudebert to kill the Scandinavian King Chlochilaich (Hygelac of Beowulf fame) who had invaded his realm. 

Theuderic got involved in the war between the Thuringian King Hermanfrid and his brother Baderic. Theuderic was promised half of Thuringia for his help; Baderic was defeated, but the land promised was not given up. In 531, Theuderic then, with his brother Chlothar and his son, attacked Thuringia to avenge himself on Hermanfrid. With the assistance of the Saxons under Duke Hadugato, Thuringia was conquered, and Chlothar received Radegund, daughter of King Berthar (Hermanfrid's late brother). Hermanfrid was killed in battle at Unstrut and his kingdom was annexed.

The four sons of Clovis then all fought the Burgundian kings Sigismund and Godomar; Godomar fled and Sigismund was taken prisoner by Chlodomer.  Theuderic married Sigismund's daughter Suavegotha.  Godomar rallied the Burgundian army and won back his kingdom.  Chlodomer, aided by Theuderic, defeated Godomar, but died in the fighting at Vézeronce.

After making a treaty with his brother Childebert, Theuderic died in 534.  Upon his death the throne of Metz, passed (without hindrance, unexpectedly) to his son Theudebert.  Theuderic also left a daughter Theodechild (by his wife Suavegotha, daughter of the defeated Sigismund of Burgundy). Theodechild founded the Abbey of St-Pierre le Vif at Sens.

Notes

References

Sources

Further reading

Bachrach, Bernard S. (1972). Merovingian Military Organization, 481–751. Minneapolis: University of Minnesota Press, . 
Geary, Patrick J. (1988). Before France and Germany: The Creation and Transformation of the Merovingian World. Oxford: Oxford University Press, . 
James, Edward (1991). The Franks. London: Blackwell, . 
Oman, Charles (1914). The Dark Ages, 476–918. London: Rivingtons. 
Wallace-Hadrill, J. M. (1962). The Long-Haired Kings, and Other Studies in Frankish History. London: Methuen. 

Merovingian kings
Frankish warriors
485 births
534 deaths
6th-century Frankish kings